The National Museum of Australia, in the national capital Canberra, preserves and interprets Australia's social history, exploring the key issues, people and events that have shaped the nation. It was formally established by the National Museum of Australia Act 1980.

The museum did not have a permanent home until 11 March 2001, when a purpose-built museum building was officially opened.

The museum profiles 50,000 years of Indigenous heritage, settlement since 1788 and key events including Federation and the Sydney 2000 Olympics. The museum holds the world's largest collection of Aboriginal bark paintings and stone tools, the heart of champion racehorse Phar Lap and the Holden prototype No. 1 car.

The museum also develops and travels exhibitions on subjects ranging from bushrangers to surf lifesaving. The National Museum of Australia Press publishes a wide range of books, catalogues and journals. The museum's Research Centre takes a cross-disciplinary approach to history, ensuring the museum is a lively forum for ideas and debate about Australia's past, present and future.

The museum's innovative use of new technologies has been central to its growing international reputation in outreach programming, particularly with regional communities. From 2003 to 2008, the museum hosted Talkback Classroom, a student political forum.

The museum is located on Acton Peninsula in the suburb of Acton, next to the Australian National University. The peninsula on Lake Burley Griffin was previously the home of the Royal Canberra Hospital, which was demolished in tragic circumstances on 13 July 1997.

Architecture

As designed by architect Howard Raggatt (design architect and design director for the project), the museum building is based on a theme of knotted ropes, symbolically bringing together the stories of Australians. The architects stated: "We liked to think that the story of Australia was not one, but many tangled together. Not an authorized version but a puzzling confluence; not merely the resolution of difference but its wholehearted embrace." The building is meant to be the centre of a knot, with trailing ropes or strips extending from the building. The most obvious of these extensions forms a large loop before becoming a walkway which extends past the neighbouring AIATSIS building ending in a large curl, as if a huge ribbon has haphazardly unrolled itself along the ground. Known as the "Uluru Axis" because it aligns with the central Australian natural landmark, the ribbon symbolically integrates the site with the Canberra city plan by Walter Burley Griffin and the spiritual heart of indigenous Australia.

The shape of the main entrance hall continues this theme: it is as though the otherwise rectangular building has been built encasing a complex knot which does not quite fit inside the building, and then the knot taken away. The entirely non-symmetrical complex is designed to not look like a museum, with startling colours and angles, unusual spaces and unpredictable projections and textures.

Though hard to precisely categorise, the building can be seen as an example of Charles Jencks' "new paradigm". Some characteristics of Deconstructivism can also be identified.

The organising concept of the scheme using the idea of a "tangled vision" incorporates a variety of references including:
Bea Maddock's "Philosophy Tape"
Jackson Pollock's "Blue Poles"
boolean string, a knot, and Ariadne's thread
the Aboriginal Dreamtime story of the Rainbow Serpent making the land.

The building's architecture is thus meant to imply that the story of Australia is not one story, but many stories tangled together. The building also refers to or quotes other buildings:
a Burley-Griffin designed cloister at Newman College in Melbourne
the Sydney Opera Houseboth the parts designed by Jørn Utzon, and sections designed by the other architects
the shell curves of Félix Candela
the Hall is evocative of Eero Saarinen's terminal at the J F Kennedy Airport in New York
the arc is like a piece of work by Richard Serra
the Garden of Australian Dreams is meant to evoke a range of different cartographies
the walls use selected fragments of the word Eternityevoking the story of Arthur Stace who for thirty years chalked this single word on the pavements of Sydney
the most controversial quotation is a reference to the Daniel Libeskind's Jewish Museum Berlin, Germany which opened in 1999

The plan of the National Museum of Australia incorporates an exact copy of the lightning-flash zigzag that Libeskind created for the Berlin Museum by breaking a star of David. The Bulletin magazine first publicly raised allegations of plagiarism in June 2000. Libeskind was reported to be angry with the copying. Raggatt's defence against plagiarism was that the design was a quotation rather than a copy. The director of the museum, Dawn Casey, stated that she and her council were not aware of this symbolism when they approved the plan.

The exterior of the building is covered in anodised aluminium panels. Many of the panels include words written in braille and other decorative devices. Among the messages are "mate" and "she'll be right". Also included were such controversial words and phrases as "sorry" and "forgive us our genocide". These more controversial messages have been obscured with silver discs being attached to the surface making the braille illegible.

Among the phrases in braille are the words "Resurrection city". The phrase may refer to the clearing of the former Canberra Hospital to make way for the museum or it could be a reference to reconciliation between Indigenous Australians and European settlers. The phrase is used as a label in tiles on another of Raggett's buildings, the Storey Hall in Melbourne. Raggett says of that message: "I guess that tries to be some big sort of theme for this building as well and its sort of set of memories."

It was built by Bovis Lend Lease and completed in 2001.

Hail storm damage

A severe thunderstorm hit Canberra on the afternoon of 29 December 2006 and caused roof damage to the administration section of the museum. The ceiling collapsed under the weight of hail. The damage exposed power cables and left two centimetres of water on the floor.  The water also damaged several paintings by a Sydney artist which were associated with an exhibition about Australian lifesavers. However, the main part of the building was unaffected and nothing from the museum's collection was damaged. The building was re-opened to the public a day later. The damage was expected to cost at least A$500,000 to repair.

Building works 2012/13
In 2012, building works commenced on a new cafe and administration wing.

The new cafe opened in late 2012. It overlooks Lake Burley Griffin and offers both indoor and outdoor dining. The relocation of the museum's cafe freed up the vast entry Hall for the display of large objects from the museum's collection, including vehicles.

The new administration wing, which links the main building with the existing administration building, was completed in mid-2013. The new building is clad in brightly coloured tiles arranged in a QR code pattern.

Collection 
The museum's collection, known as the National Historical Collection, includes over 210,000 objects. The collection focuses on three themes: the culture and history of Aboriginal and Torres Strait Islander peoples, Australian history and culture since European settlement in 1788, and interactions between people and the Australian environment. Notable objects (as identified by the museum on their website) include:
 Various items relating to the death of Azaria Chamberlain, including a Yellow Holden Torana ( Later sold to the museum by Dr Michael Chamberlain.)
 bicycles owned by Australian cyclist and 2011 winner of the Tour de France Cadel Evans
 navigational instruments used by Captain James Cook
 medical equipment used by Fred Hollows
 a Holey Dollar, the first currency minted in Australia
 netball memorabilia of Liz Ellis
 Olympic medals won by John Konrads at the 1960 Rome Olympics
 props from children's television show Play School
 an Australian flag found in the ruins of World Trade Center Three after the September 11 attacks
 the fleece of Chris the sheep

The museum also functions as a temporary repository for the repatriation of ancestral remains. It is involved in projects to return the remains of indigenous Australians, held in the collections of museums across the world, to their communities of origin. These projects have seen the return of over 1400 remains as at March 2019.

Past exhibitions
As a social history museum, National Museum of Australia exhibitions explore the land, nation and people of Australia.

Songlines: Tracking the Seven Sisters

On 15 September 2017, the exhibition Songlines: Tracking the Seven Sisters, referencing the creation story of the Seven Sisters that is common to many groups in the Western and Central Deserts, was launched at the NGA. It was instigated by anangu, and was  a collaboration with Aboriginal elders who are custodians of the Dreamtimestory. The exhibition included a huge painting called Yarrkalpa — Hunting Ground, which symbolically depicts the area around Parnngurr in Western Australia, showing the seasons, cultural burning practices and Indigenous management of the land and  natural resources. In June 2022, the work was projected onto the Sydney Opera House as part of the Vivid Sydney festival.

The exhibition ran until February 2018, and travelled to Berlin, Germany, in 2022 and is due to be shown in Paris, France, in 2023.

Other past exhibitions 
Other past exhibitions include:

 Museum Workshop: examined the behind-the-scenes world of the conservators responsible for the physical care of objects in the museum's collection (October 2012 - January 2013).
 Off the Walls: Art from Aboriginal and Torres Strait Islander Affairs Agencies 1967–2005: traced the history of artworks given to or acquired by federal Indigenous agencies - it included a collection of some 2000 works in the National Museum of Australia's National Historical Collection (October 2011 - June 2012)
 Inside: Life in Children's Homes and Institutions: featured the words, voices and objects of the Forgotten Australians, former child migrants and those who experienced institutional care as children (November 2011 - February 2012)
  Not Just Ned: A true history of the Irish in Australia: an exhibition about the history and extraordinary influence of the Irish in Australia, from the arrival of the First Fleet in 1788 to the present (March–July 2011)
  Behind the Lines: The Year's Best Cartoons 2010: celebrated the wit and artistry of Australia's established political cartoonists as well as recognising the talents of a new generation of cartoonists (December 2010 - October 2011)
  Exploration and Endeavour: The Royal Society of London and the South Seas: celebrated the 350th anniversary of the Royal Society of London and brought together unique treasures associated with voyages of scientific discovery to the South Seas (September 2010 - February 2011)
  Papunya Painting: Out of the Australian Desert: highlighted the museum's extraordinary collection of Indigenous Western Desert art (June–August 2010)
  Behind the Lines: The Year's Best Cartoons 2009: featured a selection of some of the best Australian political cartoons published in 2009 (December 2009 - January 2010)
  A Fine Yarn: Innovations in Australia's Wool Industry: examined the fine wool industry in Australia today, while recognising the importance of wool in Australia's social and economic history (July–November 2009)
  Behind the Lines: The Year's Best Cartoons 2008: featured a selection of the best Australian political cartoons published in 2008 (December 2008 - February 2009)
  Utopia: The Genius of Emily Kame Kngwarreye: told the story of Emily Kame Kngwarreye, one of Australia's greatest contemporary artists (August–October 2008)
  Behind the Lines: The Year's Best Cartoons 2007: exhibited the best of the museum's latest set of cartoon acquisitions from artists around Australia including Alan Moir, Bill Leak, Cathy Wilcox, Geoff Pryor, John Spooner and Mark Knight (December 2007 - February 2008)
  Papunya Painting: Out of the Desert: highlighted the museum's extraordinary collection of Indigenous Western Desert art – works that have rarely been seen in Australia (November 2007 - February 2008)
 Migration Memories: explored the migration stories of people from diverse backgrounds who now call the distinctively different regional centres of Lightning Ridge (an opal mining town in central north NSW) and Robinvale (a horticultural town on the Murray River in north western Victoria) home (September–November 2007)
 Australia at Expo 67 Montreal: forty years after Canada's Montreal welcomed more than 50 million visitors to Expo 67 over a period of six months, this exhibition explored the world of Australia at Expo 67 (September–October 2007)
 Great Railway Journeys of Australia: explored the development of Australia's rail network and featured some of the most famous railway journeys in the country such as the old and new Ghan, the Queenslander and the Indian Pacific (April–August 2007)
 Miss Australia: A Nation's Quest: traced the history of the Miss Australia quest from 1907 through to its final year in 2000 (March–June 2007)
 70% Urban: drew on the museum's collection to explore Indigenous culture in the city (March 2007 - March 2008)
 Collector Cam King: displayed a selection of Brian and Barbara Lynch's old grocery wares and toys following their win in the Collector Cam competition run by ABC Television's Collectors program (January–February 2007)
 Between the Flags: 100 Years of Surf Lifesaving: developed in conjunction with Surf Lifesaving Australia, this exhibition celebrated the centenary of surf lifesaving in Australia (December 2006 - March 2007)
 Behind the Lines: The Year's Best Cartoons 2006: featured the best of the museum's 2006 acquisitions of cartoons from cartoonists around Australia (December 2006 - March 2007)
 Dhari a Krar: Headdresses and Masks from the Torres Strait: developed in collaboration with the Cairns Regional Art Gallery, this exhibition brought together a diverse collection of masks, headdresses and dance objects from the Torres Strait (July 2006 - July 2011)
 Captivating and Curious: displayed the National Museum's rich and varied collection, with new acquisitions and old favourites from the National Historical Collection (December 2005 to March 2006)
 In Search of the Birdsville Track: An Artist in the Outback: featured sketches and writings donated to the museum's collection by Noelle Sandwith that capture the unique environment, characters and lifestyles of the Birdsville Track (June–October 2005)
 Behind the Lines: The Year's Best Cartoons 2004: a selection of the best works entered in the 2004 political cartooning competition (March–June 2005)
 Extremes: Survival in the Great Deserts of the Southern Hemisphere: explored some of the world's great southern deserts, tracing the history, culture and commonalities of Southern Africa's Namib and Kalahari deserts, South America's Atacama, and Australia's Red Centre (December 2004 - August 2005)
 Behind the Lines: The Year's Best Cartoons 2003: brought together a selection of the best works entered in the National Museum of Australia's 2003 Political Cartooning Competition (May–June 2004)
 Royal Romance: examined Australia's passionate response to Queen Elizabeth II's first visit to Australia in 1954, and whether the nation has fallen out of love since (February–October 2004)
 Paipa: explored Torres Strait Islander migration and the continuing strong cultural connections between mainland communities and the Torres Strait (July 2002 - July 2006)
 Nation: Symbols of Australia: from the Hills hoist clothes line to the legend of ANZAC, this exhibition approached Australian history through Australian symbols (March 2001 - January 2010)
 Horizons: The Peopling of Australia since 1788: traced stories of human relocation and looked at how migration has shaped Australia (March 2001 - October 2007)

Tourism awards
In the annual Australian Tourism Awards, the National Museum was named Australia's Major Tourist Attraction in both 2005 and 2006. The museum was named winner of the Canberra and Capital Region's Tourism Award for Major Tourist Attraction five years running from 2003 to 2007.

See also 

 HMS Investigator (1798) Anchors
 , an 1878 paddle steamer owned and operated by the Museum

References

External links

 National Museum of Australia official website
 National Museum of Australia at Google Cultural Institute
 Official National Museum of Australia Flickr photostream
 Audio on demand at the National Museum of Australia Recordings of lectures, forums and symposiums held at the National Museum of Australia
 National Museum of Australia (1980–) National Library of Australia, Trove, People and Organisation record for National Museum of Australia
 Museum of Australia National Library of Australia, Trove, People and Organisation record for Museum of Australia

Museums in Canberra
National museums of Australia
History museums in Australia
1980 establishments in Australia
Museums established in 1980